Más Vale Tarde ("It's Better Late") is a Spanish-language variety/talk show hosted by Alex Cambert. The show's debut was November 29, 2007 on Telemundo. The show followed a similar format to other English-language late-night shows. Telemundo announced that due to low ratings the show was canceled in April 2008.

Competition
Univision announced previously in its 2006 upfront presentation that they would produce their own Late Night show "¡Ay Qué Noche!" (Oh What a Night!) which would be hosted by Cristián de la Fuente. Despite the announcement, the show was not launched.

A Oscuras Pero Encendidos was the first late night talk show for Hispanics in the US Hosted By Paul Bouche.  The show started as a local Miami Production in 1995, was picked up by Galavision in 1997 and finally launched on Telemundo where it aired until 2001.

References

External links
 
 Upfront trailer

Telemundo original programming
2000s American late-night television series
2007 American television series debuts
2008 American television series endings